

Bel can mean:

Mythology
 Belenus or Bel, a Celtic deity
 Bel (mythology), a title (meaning "lord" or "master") for various gods in Babylonian religion

People
 Bel (name)
 Annabel Linquist, known as Bel, American artist, musician, and entrepreneur

Places
 Bél, the Hungarian name for Beliu Commune, Arad County, Romania
 Bel Mountain, in the Zagros Mountains of western and southwestern Iran
 Bel, Iran (disambiguation)
 Bel, Osh, village in Osh Region, Kyrgyzstan
 Bel, Syria, village in Aleppo Governorate
 Temple of Bel in Palmyra, Syria

Languages
 Bel languages, spoken in northern Papua New Guinea
 ISO 639 code for the Belarusian language

Other uses
 Groupe Bel, a France-based multinational cheese distributor
 Bel (unit), a unit of gain or loss equal to ten decibels

See also
 BEL (disambiguation)
 Bell (disambiguation)
 Belle (disambiguation)